Sommerein is a town in the district of Bruck an der Leitha in the Austrian state of Lower Austria.

Geography
Sommerein lies in the industrial area of Lower Austria. About 34.83 percent of the municipality is forested.

References

Cities and towns in Bruck an der Leitha District